Commitment is an album by guitarist Jim Hall recorded and released by the Horizon label in 1976.

Reception

Allmusic awarded the album 4  stars with the review by Scott Yanow stating "There is lots of variety on this ... He has separate duets with pianist Don Thompson, his wife Jane Hall, pianist Tommy Flanagan, and drummer Terry Clarke. He also overdubs acoustic and electric guitars ... teams up with pianist Flanagan and flugelhornist Art Farmer on two duets, and uses a slightly larger group  ... there is plenty of intriguing music on this recommended set".

Track listing
All compositions by Jim Hall except where noted
 "Walk Soft" − 7:14
 "One Morning in May" (Hoagy Carmichael, Mitchell Parish) − 3:32
 "Lament for a Fallen Matador (Based on "Adagio in G minor)" (Tomaso Albinoni) − 11:47
 "Down the Line" − 3:21
 "When I Fall in Love" (Victor Young, Edward Heyman) − 1:50
 "My One and Only Love" (Guy Wood, Robert Mellin) − 5:51
 "Bermuda Bye Bye" − 5:59
 "Indian Summer" (Victor Herbert, Al Dubin) − 6:39

Personnel
Jim Hall − guitar
Art Farmer − flugelhorn (tracks 1, 3 & 8)
Tommy Flanagan (tracks 1, 3, 6 & 8), Don Thompson (track 2) − piano
Ron Carter − bass (tracks 1, 3 & 8)
Allan Ganley (tracks 1, 3 & 8), Terry Clarke (track 7) − drums
Eroll Bennett − percussion (track 3)
Jane Hall (track 5), Joan La Barbara (track 3) − vocals
Don Sebesky − arranger (tracks 1, 3 & 8)

References 

Horizon Records albums
Jim Hall (musician) albums
1976 albums
Albums arranged by Don Sebesky